Whitesands or White Sands is a village on the island of Tanna in Vanuatu.

Located on the southeast side of the island near Sulphur Bay, the area is a center of the indigenous Whitesands language and the John Frum cargo cult. It is a growing tourist destination.

Populated places in Vanuatu
Tafea Province